This is a list of cooking anime, manga, original video animations (OVAs), original net animations (ONAs), and films.

References

Lists of anime by genre
Lists of manga by genre